Filiberto is a given name and a surname. It derives from a Germanic name, latinized in Filibertus and came to Italian through French. It is composed of the roots filu, "much", and beraht or berhta, "illustrious", "brilliant", and means "very bright" or "very illustrious". Its diffusion in Italy is linked to the fact of being a traditional name of the House of Savoy. The French form Philibert originated by alteration with the Greek φιλος (philos), "beloved".

Notable people with the name include:

Given name
 Emmanuel Philibert of Savoy (disambiguation), name of several members of the House of Savoy
 Filiberto Azcuy (born 1972), Cuban Olympic wrestler
 Filiberto Colon (born 1966), Puerto Rican Olympic swimmer 
 Filiberto Fernández (born 1972), Mexican Olympic wrestler
 Filiberto Ferrero (1500–1549), Italian Roman Catholic cardinal
 Filiberto Hernández Martínez (born 1971), Mexican serial killer
 Filiberto Mercado (born 1938), Mexican Olympic cyclist
 Filiberto Rodríguez Motamayor (1867–1915), Venezuelan writer, lawyer and poet
 Filiberto Petiti (1845–1925), Italian landscape painter
 Filiberto Ojeda Ríos (1933–2005), Puerto Rican leader of the Macheteros
 Filiberto Rivera (born 1982), Puerto Rican basketball player
 Prince Filiberto, Duke of Genoa (1895–1990), Italian duke of Genoa and member of the House of Savoy
 Rafael Filiberto Bonnelly (1904–1979), Dominican lawyer, scholar and president of the Dominican Republic, 1962–1963

Surname
 Juan de Dios Filiberto (1885–1964), Argentine violinist, conductor, poet and composer

See also
  (1893–1920), Italian pre-dreadnought battleship
 2nd Cavalry Division "Emanuele Filiberto Testa di Ferro" (1930–1943), a military unit of Italy in World War II
  (1932–1959), Italian light cruiser warship